Kent is an American brand of cigarettes, currently owned and manufactured by R.J. Reynolds Tobacco Company in the United States and British American Tobacco elsewhere. The brand is named after Herbert Kent, a former executive at Lorillard Tobacco Company.

History

Widely recognized by many as the first popular filtered cigarette, Kent was introduced by the Lorillard Tobacco Company in 1952 around the same time a series of articles entitled "cancer by the carton", published by Reader's Digest, scared American consumers into seeking out a filter brand at a time when most brands were filterless. (Viceroy cigarettes had been the first to introduce filters, in 1936.) Kent widely touted its "famous micronite filter" and promised consumers the "greatest health protection in history". Sales of Kent skyrocketed, and it has been estimated that in Kent's first four years on the market, Lorillard sold some 13 billion Kent cigarettes. From March 1952 until at least May 1956, however, the Micronite filter in Kent cigarettes contained compressed carcinogenic blue asbestos within the crimped crepe paper. It has been suspected that many cases of mesothelioma have been caused specifically by smoking the original Kent cigarettes, and various lawsuits followed over the years because of it. Lorillard quietly changed the filter material from asbestos to the more common cellulose acetate in mid 1956. Kent continued to grow until the late 1960s, then began a long, steady decline as more filtered cigarette brands promising even lower tar (and appealing to smokers' desires for a "safer" smoke) were introduced.

Kent Cigarettes sponsored The Dick Van Dyke Show during its second season, and actor Dick Van Dyke filmed many spots smoking them, along with Rose Marie and Morey Amsterdam.  The cigarettes were touted as being packaged in a "crush proof box".

However, Kent continued to stay in the top ten cigarette brand list until 1979. While continuing domestic sale and production, Lorillard sold the overseas rights of Kent and all of its other brands in 1977, and today Kents manufactured outside the U.S. are property of British American Tobacco.  It eventually became one of their most popular brands, along with Dunhill, Lucky Strike, Pall Mall and Rothmans.

On June 15, 2014 Reynolds American offered to buy the Lorillard tobacco company for $27.4 billion and effective June 12, 2015, the Kent brand became the property of R.J. Reynolds Tobacco Company.

Various advertising posters were made for Kent cigarettes, ranging from 1955 until 1986.

Kent in the U.S.
Currently, Kents sold in the U.S. are only available in soft packs.
Kent Classic - Kings and 100s (Full Flavor)
Kent Golden - Kings and 100s (Lights)
Kent III - Kings and 100s (Ultra Lights)

Kent also manufactured a regular size filter option (the same size as unfiltered Camels, Lucky Strikes).  This is notable since most filter cigarettes were king-size. This size was offered at least through the 1970s, and possibly later. They are no longer available.

Kent in Romania
Between 1970 and 1990 Kent was the most demanded cigarette in Romania and in some parts of the domestic market used as payment or bribe. In the latter part of the interval, Kent was no longer available in regular retail, being sold officially only in hard currency shops. Obviously, the black market was thriving at the time, as most Kents were being smuggled in by those relatively few Romanians who were allowed to travel abroad (sea and air crew, diplomatic staff, etc.)
The 2004 debut short film  by Cristi Puiu is titled after the bribes discussed in the film.

Kent in Vietnam

Among the migrant worker community of English teachers in Vietnam, (esp. Hanoi) menthol Kent cigarettes have become a beloved accessory. A large part of this community consists of non-smokers who buy and smoke menthol Kents whilst drinking on the weekend. Kent "boom" (meaning push in Vietnamese and referring to the menthol bubble that the smoker presses and pops to change the flavour to menthol) are enjoyed by some who don't even press the button, others who press immediately and a whole host of subcultural groups that press halfway, after one draw, before the last draw, or before offering to a friend, and so on.

Markets
Kent is or was sold in the following countries: Australia, Belgium, Brazil, Republic of Ireland, United Kingdom, Norway, Sweden, Finland, Estonia, Luxembourg, Netherlands, Germany,Greece, Switzerland, Austria, Spain, Italy, Poland, Romania, Moldova, Czech Republic, Croatia, Serbia, Iraq, Albania, Latvia, Lithuania, Belarus, Ukraine, Russia, Azerbaijan, Georgia, Kazakhstan, Uzbekistan, Egypt, South Africa, Syria, Israel, Iran, United States, Kosovo Mexico, El Salvador, Chile, Turkey, Peru, Brazil, Paraguay, Argentina, Vietnam, Singapore, Mongolia, China, Saudi Arabia, Hong Kong, Japan and South Korea.

See also
 Tobacco smoking

References

1952 establishments in the United States
Asbestos disasters
Asbestos
British American Tobacco brands
Products introduced in 1952
R. J. Reynolds Tobacco Company brands
Socialist Republic of Romania